Campo de Mayo Airport  is a military airport located near San Miguel, Buenos Aires, Argentina.

The airport is within a  military reservation surrounded by urban areas in the northwest suburbs of Buenos Aires. Approach and departure will be over densely populated areas. Runway length includes  paved overruns on both ends.

See also

Transport in Argentina
List of airports in Argentina

References

External links 
OpenStreetMap - Campo de Mayo Airport
OurAirports - Campo de Mayo Airport

Airports in Buenos Aires Province